The Vinkovci Synagogue was a synagogue in Vinkovci, Croatia. It was among the largest and the most prestigious synagogues in Croatia.

The Jewish community Vinkovci was established with the  arrival of the first Jews in 1873, and the first synagogue was built in 1880. The growth of the Jewish community in Vinkovci, as well as its tangible affirmation in the society, made the first synagogue insufficient. The first initiative to build a new synagogue appeared in 1911. Construction was scheduled to begin as soon as the financial structure was completed and appropriate place was found. World War I postponed the construction. After the war the main problem was financing. Due to the inflation of the Yugoslav krone, community could not finance the construction solely from the contribution of its members. In 1920, the fundraising started, and at that time the Jewish community of Vinkovci had about 200 members, of which 150 lived in Vinkovci and another 50 in the surrounding villages. In the mid-1922, thanks to the persistence and organizational capabilities of rabbi Mavro Frankfurter, the construction of the synagogue started. Jakob Schlesinger, a wealthy wholesaler and the owner of the steam mill in Vinkovci, gave the largest financial contribution to the construction.

The Second Vinkovci Synagogue was built under the architect Frank Funtak in the Aleksandar street (today the Zvonimir street 18–20). The total cost of construction was 4,5 million krones. Funtak turned to classicism when choosing styles for the Vinkovci Synagogue. Although this style dominated, the building also had elements of the 19th-century synagogue architecture and of art deco. The synagogue dome was built in Mudéjar style, while double windows and the trefoil upper row of windows were built in rundbogenstil. Vinkovci Synagogue had a longitudinal construction with a rectangular shape. Funtak took the dome style from the Vukovar Synagogue. In addition to the dome, a tripartite front was a traditional element of the synagogue architecture from the 20th century. The central part of the facade was slightly withdrawn in relation to the side. The sides of the synagogue were visually highlighted with an art deco set of gables above the cornice of the building.

Vinkovci Synagogue was destroyed during World War II in 1941-42 by the regime of the Independent State of Croatia. Rabbi Mavro Frankfurter and president of the community Ignjat Lang were both killed in the Jasenovac concentration camp.

References

Sources
 

Destroyed synagogues in Croatia
Vinkovci
Religious buildings and structures in Vukovar-Syrmia County
Ashkenazi Jewish culture in Croatia
Ashkenazi synagogues
Former synagogues in Croatia
Buildings and structures demolished in 1942
1942 disestablishments in Europe
1940s disestablishments in Croatia
Synagogues completed in 1923
1923 establishments in Croatia
Moorish Revival synagogues
Buildings and structures destroyed during World War II